Amuse is a digital music distribution service as well as independent record label founded 2015 in Stockholm, Sweden by entrepreneurs Diego Farias, Andreas Ahlenius, Christian Wilsson, Guy Parry and Jimmy Brodd. The company offers free digital music distribution, technology services and license deals to artists and independent labels, who retain 100% of their music ownership rights. Amuse is based in Stockholm, Sweden. In 2021, Roshi Motman was appointed CEO of the company.

History 

Amuse was founded in 2015 by Diego Farias, Andreas Ahlenius, Christian Wilsson, Guy Parry and Jimmy Brodd. The Amuse iOS and Android application was released in March 2017. In June 2017, American rapper, singer, songwriter, DJ, record producer, voice actor and philanthropist will.i.am joined the company's list of co-founders. Later on in May 2018 Amuse raised $15,5M USD in series A funding round led by venture capital firms Lakestar and Raine Ventures. In April 2019 the company launched Fast Forward - a tech service for music distribution users as well as a web application. In the end of 2018, Lil Nas X uploaded his song Old Town Road through Amuse. According to former CEO Diego Farias, he had previously uploaded several tracks which had not gained much attention. However, in the beginning of 2019 the company could see, through their algorithms, that Old Town Road was doing extremely well, and so they offered the artist a deal. Lil Nas X later on chose to sign a deal with Columbia Records. The song Old Town Road, featuring Billy Ray Cyrus, ended up becoming one of the most prized songs in the history of Billboard Hot 100, as it spent record-breaking 19 weeks at No.1.

Operations 

Amuse have two main operations - digital music distribution and licensing of music. They provide musicians and other rights-holders with the opportunity to distribute, sell and stream their music through digital music stores.

The data-driven royalty advance service Fast Forward that was officially launched in April 2019, utilizes machine learning to calculate and offer users up to six months of their upcoming royalties through the Amuse smartphone application. The company's also operating in music licensing - from its distribution service, the company has access to the consumption data of how their users' music is being streamed and purchased, as well as the demographics of each artists' audience. Amuse leverages this data to identify emerging talent and offer selected artists licensing deals.

Financials 

Amuseio is based in Sweden and is required to release their financials. In 2020 they had a gross revenue of $17.4m USD and made $7.5m USD loss.

References

External links 
 {https://www.amuse.io/en/}}
 

https://www.techcrunch.com/2018/05/22/amuse/

https://www.feber.se/mobil/art/362391/ha_ditt_skivbolag_i_fickan/
Delivery Company

Music production companies
Companies based in Stockholm